Document of Identity may refer to:

 An Identity document
 Australian Document of Identity
Hong Kong Document of Identity